"On Reflection" is a song by the progressive rock band Gentle Giant. It was released on their 1975 album Free Hand.

Composition
"On Reflection" is in the key of B-flat major. It features a fouror five part Polyphony of voices.

Bruce Eder of AllMusic wrote that the song had "medieval-style a cappella vocals", while The Great Rock Bible described the song as a "folk rocker".

Reception
Robert Taylor of AllMusic wrote that "On Reflection" was revolutionary for its time, due to the band's vocal approach. Taylor also wrote that the song was one of prog-rock's defining moments.

uDiscoverMusic also commented on the song positively, writing that the song's opening four-part fugue remains one of Gentle Giant's and the progressive rock genre's defining moments.

Paul Stump in the 2005 book Acquiring the Taste wrote that the song was an example of the band's "mastery of writing and performing intensly complex contrapuntal music", and that it was an instant hit when they performed live.

Other appearances
A live performance of the song (recorded in 1976) is also included on the 1977 album Playing the Fool.

References

1975 songs